Euxoa oranaria is a moth of the family Noctuidae. It is found in Morocco, Saudi Arabia, Jordan, Israel and Syria.

Adults are on wing in November. There is one generation per year.

External links
 Noctuinae of Israel

Euxoa
Moths of the Middle East
Moths described in 1906